Thermaikos Thermis Football Club is a Greek football club based in Thermi, Macedonia, Greece. It was founded in 1949.

 
Football clubs in Central Macedonia
1949 establishments in Greece
Gamma Ethniki clubs